Barwar is a Kshatriya dynasty, which is of Vats / Vatsyan clan, they reached Triveni Sangam via Ujjain from Rajasthan in 1770.
The name of a head of his panchayat, Ahankaro Rai, who was a Barwar Sardar, entered Awadh under his leadership and established a town which is eleven kos from Faizabad city. Later, battles were fought for many Rajputs from here. Barwars are mainly concentrated in the Gonda district of Uttar Pradesh.

The Barwar fought for many Rajputs from 17th century till 1857 and against the British. The largest revolt in Awadh province of the country, Barwars had also captured some of the limited land of Awadh province.

1758 ईशवि में उम्रचन्द्र बरवार उदयपुर के एक दीवान उज्जैन के पास राजपूतो और मराठाओ का युद्ध होने पर राणा उर्सों हारे थे उदयपुर को सेंधियो के घेरने पर इन्होने बड़े बुद्धि बल और पराक्रमण से बचाया था एक ऋषि असून किच्चा इनलोगो को वात्स्यान/वत्स वंशिये कहते है जो एक प्राचीन क्षत्रिय/ऋषि वंश है बंगला विश्व कोश के संपादक श्री नगेन्द्रनाथ वशु द्वारा भाग 3 पृष्ठ सं 381 पर उल्लेख किया है 2011 Census of India it showed the Barwar population as 18,105.

References

3.^ https://archive.org/details/HqPZ_hindi-vishva-kosh-vol-3-by-nagendranath-vasu-1919-vishvanath-vasu-calcutta/page/n380/mode/1up?q=%E0%A4%AC%E0%A4%B0%E0%A4%B5%E0%A4%BE%E0%A4%B0

4.^ https://archive.org/details/Qhpw_hindi-vishva-kosh-vol-2-by-nagendranath-vasu-1917-vishvanath-vasu-calcutta/page/n449/mode/1up?q=%E0%A4%AC%E0%A4%B0%E0%A4%B5%E0%A4%BE%E0%A4%B0

Indian castes
Denotified tribes of India